The 2019 AFC Champions League Final was the final of the 2019 AFC Champions League, the 38th edition of the top-level Asian club football tournament organized by the Asian Football Confederation (AFC), and the 17th under the current AFC Champions League title.

The final was contested in two-legged home-and-away format between Saudi Arabian team Al-Hilal and Japanese team Urawa Red Diamonds. The first leg was hosted by Al-Hilal at the King Saud University Stadium in Riyadh on 9 November 2019, while the second leg was hosted by Urawa Red Diamonds at the Saitama Stadium 2002 in Saitama on 24 November 2019. The final was a rematch of the 2017 final, which Urawa Red Diamonds won 2–1 on aggregate.

Al-Hilal won their third Asian club championship, tying the record set by the Pohang Steelers for most in the competition's history. They won 3–0 on aggregate, having defeated the Urawa Red Diamonds 1–0 in the first leg and 2–0 in the second. This marked the first time in eight years that a team from West Zone won the competition since Al Sadd won it in 2011. As winners, Al-Hilal earned the right to represent the AFC at the 2019 FIFA Club World Cup, entering at the second round.

Teams
In the following table, finals until 2002 were in the Asian Club Championship era, since 2003 were in the AFC Champions League era.

Notes

Venues

This was the first time that an Asian club final took place at the King Saud University Stadium. Saitama Stadium 2002 hosted an Asian club final for the third time, having previously hosted the second legs of 2007 and 2017.

Road to the final

Note: In all results below, the score of the finalist is given first (H: home; A: away).

Format
The final was played on a home-and-away two-legged basis, with the order of legs (first leg hosted by team from the West Region, second leg hosted by team from the East Region) reversed from the previous season's final. The away goals rule, extra time (away goals do not apply in extra time) and penalty shoot-out would have been used to decide the winning side if necessary (Regulations, Section 3. 11.2 & 11.3).

Matches

First leg

Summary
Peruvian André Carrillo scored the only goal of the match for Al-Hilal.

Details

Statistics

Second leg

Summary
Salem Al-Dawsari scored for Al-Hilal after 74 minutes before Bafétimbi Gomis made his eleventh goal of the tournament, earning him the top goalscorer and best player titles aside of the AFC Champions League trophy.

Details

Statistics

See also
2019 AFC Cup Final

References

External links
, the-AFC.com
AFC Champions League 2019, stats.the-AFC.com

2019
Final
November 2019 sports events in Asia
November 2019 sports events in Japan
International club association football competitions hosted by Saudi Arabia
International club association football competitions hosted by Japan
Al Hilal SFC matches
Urawa Red Diamonds matches